King George V Playing Fields were established in memory of King George V, who died in 1936.

References

Parks and open spaces in Essex
Sports venues in Essex
Essex
Lists of buildings and structures in Essex